Kepler-24c is an exoplanet orbiting the star Kepler-24, located in the constellation Lyra. It was discovered by the Kepler telescope in January 2012. It orbits its parent star at only 0.106 astronomical units away, and at its distance it completes an orbit once every 12.3335 days.

References

Transiting exoplanets
Kepler-24
Exoplanets discovered by the Kepler space telescope
Exoplanets discovered in 2012

Lyra (constellation)